Brachychalcinus orbicularis, or the discus tetra, is an omnivorous characin found in rivers, creeks, and tributaries in tropical South America.

References

https://www.iucnredlist.org/species/175960637/175960674

Characidae
Taxa named by Achille Valenciennes
Fish described in 1850